The gyrfalcon ( or ), the largest of the falcon species, is a bird of prey. The abbreviation gyr is also used. It breeds on Arctic coasts and tundra, and the islands of northern North America and the Eurosiberian region. It is mainly a resident there also, but some gyrfalcons disperse more widely after the breeding season, or in winter. Individual vagrancy can take birds for long distances. Its plumage varies with location, with birds being coloured from all-white to dark brown. These colour variations are called morphs. Like other falcons, it shows sexual dimorphism, with the female much larger than the male. For centuries, the gyrfalcon has been valued as a hunting bird. Typical prey includes the ptarmigan and waterfowl, which it may take in flight; it also takes fish and mammals.

Taxonomy and etymology
The gyrfalcon was formally described by  Swedish naturalist Carl Linnaeus in 1758 in the tenth edition of his Systema Naturae under its current binomial name Falco rusticolus. The genus name is the Late Latin term for a falcon, from  a sickle, referencing the talons of the bird. The male gyrfalcon is called a gyrkin in falconry.

Description
The gyrfalcon is the largest falcon in the world, being about the same size as the largest buteos (buzzards) but probably slightly heavier. An outsized female from eastern Siberia was found to have scaled . The gyrfalcon is larger, broader-winged and longer-tailed than the peregrine falcon, which it is known to compete with (and occasionally hunt). It differs from the buzzard in general structure, having pointed wings.

The gyrfalcon is a very polymorphic species, so its plumage varies greatly. The archetypal morphs are called "white", "silver", "brown", and "black", though they can be coloured on a spectrum from all-white to very dark. The brown form of the gyrfalcon is distinguished from the peregrine by the cream streaking on the nape and crown and by the absence of a well-defined malar stripe and cap. The black morph has a strongly black-spotted underside, rather than finely barred as in the peregrine. White form gyrfalcons are the only predominantly white falcons. Silver gyrfalcons resemble a light grey lanner falcon of larger size. The species shows no sex-based colour differences; juveniles are darker and browner than adults.

The black color seems to be sex-linked and to occur mostly in females; it proved difficult for breeders to get males darker than the dark side of slate grey. A color variety that arose in captive breeding is "black chick".

Systematics and evolution

The gyrfalcon is a member of the hierofalcon complex. In this group, ample evidence indicates hybridisation and incomplete lineage sorting, which confounds analyses of DNA sequence data to a massive extent. The radiation of the entire living diversity of hierofalcons took place around the Eemian Stage at the start of the Late Pleistocene. It represents lineages that expanded into the Holarctic and adapted to local conditions; this is in contrast to less northerly populations of northeastern Africa (where the radiation probably originated) that evolved into the saker falcon. Gyrfalcons hybridize not infrequently with sakers in the Altai Mountains, and this gene flow seems to be the origin of the Altai falcon.

Some correlation exists between locality and colour morph. Greenland gyrfalcons are lightest, with white plumage flecked with grey on the back and wings being most common. Other subpopulations have varying amounts of the darker morphs: the Icelandic birds tend towards pale, whereas the Eurasian populations are considerably darker and typically incorporate no white birds. Natural separation into regional subspecies is prevented by gyrfalcons' habit of flying long distances whilst exchanging alleles between subpopulations; thus, the allele distributions for the color polymorphism form clines and in darker birds of unknown origin, theoretically any allele combination might be present. For instance, a mating of a pair of captive gyrfalcons is documented to have produced a clutch of four young: one white, one silver, one brown, and one black. Molecular work suggests plumage color is associated with the melanocortin 1 receptor gene (MC1R), where a nonsynonymous point substitution was perfectly associated with the white/melanic polymorphism.

In general, geographic variation follows Bergmann's rule for size and the demands of crypsis for plumage coloration. Several subspecies have been named according to perceived differences between populations but none of these are consistent and thus no living subspecies are currently accepted. The Icelandic population described as F. r. islandus is perhaps the most distinct. The predominantly white Arctic forms are parapatric and seamlessly grade into the subarctic populations. The Icelandic types are presumed to have less gene flow with their neighbors; they show less variation in plumage colors. Comprehensive phylogeographic studies to determine the proper status of the Icelandic population have yet to be performed.

A population genetic study, however, identified the Iceland population as genetically unique relative to other sampled populations in both eastern and western Greenland, Canada, Alaska, and Norway. Further, within Greenland, differing levels of gene flow between western and eastern sampling locations were identified, with apparent asymmetric dispersal in western Greenland from north to south. This dispersal bias is in agreement with the distribution of plumage colour variants with white gyrfalcons in much higher proportion in north Greenland. Although further work is required to determine the ecological factors contributing to these distributions relative to plumage differences, a study using demographic data suggested that plumage color distribution in Greenland may be influenced by nesting chronology with white individuals and pairs laying eggs earlier in the breeding season and producing more offspring.

Swarth's gyrfalcon
A paleosubspecies, Falco rusticolus swarthi, existed during the Late Pleistocene (125,000 to 13,000 years ago). Fossils found in Little Box Elder Cave (Converse County, Wyoming), Dark Canyon Cave (Eddy County, New Mexico), and McKittrick, California were initially described as Falco swarthi ("Swarth falcon" or more properly "Swarth's gyrfalcon") on account of their distinct size. They have meanwhile proven to be largely inseparable from those of living gyrfalcons, except for being somewhat larger.

Swarth's gyrfalcon was on the upper end of the present gyrfalcon's size range, with some stronger females even surpassing it. It seems to have had some adaptations to the temperate semiarid climate that predominated in its range during the last ice age. Ecologically more similar to current Siberian populations (which are generally composed of smaller birds) or to the prairie falcon, this temperate steppe population must have preyed on landbirds and mammals rather than the sea and landbirds which make up much of the American gyrfalcon's diet today.

Ecology

The gyrfalcon was originally thought to be a bird of tundra and mountains only; however, in June 2011, it was revealed to spend considerable periods during the winter on sea ice far from land. It feeds only on birds and mammals, the latter of which it takes more regularly than many other Falco species. Like other hierofalcons, it usually hunts in a horizontal pursuit, rather than with the peregrine's speedy stoop from a height. Most prey is killed on the ground, whether they are captured there, or if the victim is a flying bird, forced to the ground. The diet is to some extent opportunistic, but a majority breed and hunt coinciding with ptarmigan and seabird colonies. Avian prey can range in size from redpolls to geese and can include gulls, corvids, smaller passerines, ducks, sparrows, buntings, doves, grouse, waders, and other raptors (up to the size of Buteos). Mammalian prey can range in size from shrews to marmots (sometimes thrice the weight of the assaulting falcon), and often includes lemmings, mice, voles, ground squirrels, hares, rabbits, and rarely also bats. Gyrfalcons also hunt fish. They are rarely observed eating carrion.

Threat from climate change
In the early 2000s, it was observed that as climate change began to temper the Arctic summers, peregrine falcons were expanding their range north to parts of Greenland, and competing with gyrfalcons. Although it is specially adapted for high-Arctic life, and larger than the peregrine, the gyrfalcon is less aggressive and more conflict-averse, and so is unable to compete with peregrines, which regularly attack and overwhelm the gyrs.

Breeding
The gyrfalcon almost invariably nests on cliff faces. Breeding pairs do not build their own nests, and often use a bare cliff ledge or the abandoned nest of other birds, particularly golden eagles and common ravens. The clutch can range from 1 to 5 eggs, but is usually 2 to 4. The nestlings are brooded usually for 10 to 15 days and leave the nest at 7 to 8 weeks. At 3 to 4 months of age, the immature gyrfalcons become independent of their parents, though they may associate with their siblings through the following winter.

The only natural predators of gyrfalcons are golden eagles, and even they rarely engage with these formidable falcons. Gyrfalcons have been recorded as aggressively harassing animals that come near their nests, although common ravens are the only predators known to successfully pick off gyrfalcon eggs and hatchlings. Even brown bears have been reportedly dive-bombed. Humans, whether accidentally (automobile collisions or poisoning of carrion to kill mammalian scavengers) or intentionally (through hunting), are the leading cause of death for gyrfalcons. Gyrfalcons that survive into adulthood can live up to 20 years of age.

As F. rusticolus has such a wide range, it is not considered a threatened species by the IUCN. It is not much affected by habitat destruction, but pollution, for instance by pesticides, depressed its numbers in the mid-20th century, and until 1994 it was considered "Near Threatened". Improving environmental standards in developed countries have allowed the birds to make a comeback.

Interaction with humans 

The gyrfalcon has long associated with humans, primarily for hunting and in the art of falconry. It is the official bird of Canada's Northwest Territories. The white falcon in the crest of the Icelandic Republic's coat of arms is a variety of gyrfalcon. The white phase gyrfalcon is the official mascot of the United States Air Force Academy.

In the medieval era, the gyrfalcon was considered a royal bird. The geographer and historian Ibn Sa'id al-Maghribi (d. 1286) described certain northern Atlantic islands west of Ireland where these falcons would be brought from, and how the Egyptian Sultan paid 1,000 dinars for each gyrfalcon (or, if it arrived dead, 500 dinars). Due to its rarity and the difficulties involved in obtaining it, in European falconry the gyrfalcon was reserved for kings and nobles; very rarely was a man of lesser rank seen with a gyrfalcon on his fist.

In the 12th century AD China, swan-hunting with gyrfalcons (海東青 hǎidōngqīng in Chinese) obtained from the Jurchen tribes became fashionable among the Khitan nobility. When demand for gyrfalcons exceeded supply, the Liao Emperor imposed a tax payment-in-kind of gyrfalcons on the Jurchen; under the last Liao emperor, tax collectors were entitled to use force to procure sufficient gyrfalcons. This was one cause of the Jurchen rebellion, whose leader Aguda annihilated the Liao empire in 1125, and established the Jin dynasty in its stead.

Most historians agree that the coat of arms of Ukraine, the medieval symbol, was not intended to depict a trident, but most likely a stylized falcon. Depictions of a flying falcon with a cross above its head have been found in Old Ladoga, the first seat of Kievan Rurik dynasty, of Scandinavian lineage. For centuries falconry has been a royal sport in Europe. Also known also as the Norwegian falcon, it was considered a royal bird and is mentioned (uk: кречет) in one of the earliest epics of Ruthenia, the 12th century poem The Tale of Igor's Campaign. The gyrfalcon is related to other falcons. Falcons are known to be very susceptible to avian influenza. Therefore, an experiment was done with hybrid gyr-saker falcons, which found that five falcons vaccinated with a commercial H5N2 influenza vaccine survived infection with a highly pathogenic H5N1 strain, whereas five unvaccinated falcons died. Thus, both wild and captive gyrfalcons can be protected from bird flu by vaccination.

Notes

References

Further reading 
 Audubon, John James.  "The Iceland or Jer Falcon", Ornithological Biography volume 2 (1834).  Another specimen described in volume 4 (1838).  Illustration from Birds of America octavo edition, 1840.

External links

 Alaska Falcons – White and Silver Gyrfalcons
 Gyrfalcon Species Account – Cornell Lab of Ornithology
 Gyrfalcon stamps at bird-stamps.org
 
 
 
 
 
 

Birds of the Arctic
Arctic land animals
Birds described in 1758
Taxa named by Carl Linnaeus
Holarctic birds
Falco (genus)
Falconry
Symbols of the Northwest Territories